Mahmud ibn Muhammad (10 July 1757 – 28 March 1824) was the seventh leader of the Husainid Dynasty and the ruler of Tunisia from 1814 until his death in 1824.

See also
Hussein Khodja

References

1757 births
1824 deaths
Beys of Tunis
Tunisian royalty